The Xianshen River Bridge is a cable-stayed bridge near Jincheng, in Shanxi, China.

See also
List of tallest bridges in the world

References

Cable-stayed bridges in China
Bridges completed in 2009
Jincheng